Haldor Lægreid (born 30 March 1970) is a Norwegian musical artist. He is most recognized as the performer of the power ballad "On My Own", Norway's entry at the Eurovision Song Contest 2001 in Copenhagen, Denmark. Haldor finished last, only obtaining three points from Portugal. "On My Own" reached number five on the Norway Singles Chart.

References 

1970 births
Living people
Norwegian pop singers
Musicians from Tromsø
Eurovision Song Contest entrants for Norway
Melodi Grand Prix contestants
Eurovision Song Contest entrants of 2001
Melodi Grand Prix winners
English-language singers from Norway
21st-century Norwegian singers
21st-century Norwegian male singers